New Zealand's Dane River is a tributary of the Awatere River.

See also
List of rivers of New Zealand

References

Land Information New Zealand - Search for Place Names

Rivers of the Marlborough Region
Rivers of New Zealand